The 2013 Jalisco Open was a professional tennis tournament played on hard courts. It was the third edition of the tournament which was part of the 2013 ATP Challenger Tour. It took place in Guadalajara, Mexico between 8 and 14 April 2013.

Singles main-draw entrants

Seeds

 1 Rankings are as of April 1, 2013.

Other entrants
The following players received wildcards into the singles main draw:
  Miguel Gallardo Valles
  Nicolás Massú
  Eduardo Peralta-Tello
  Miguel Ángel Reyes-Varela

The following players received entry from the qualifying draw:
  Marin Draganja
  Maximilian Neuchrist
  Bumpei Sato
  Peter Torebko

Doubles main-draw entrants

Seeds

1 Rankings as of April 1, 2013.

Other entrants
The following pairs received wildcards into the doubles main draw:
  Nicolás Massú /  Miguel Ángel Reyes-Varela
  Alejandro Moreno Figueroa /  Manuel Sánchez

Champions

Singles

 Alex Bogomolov Jr. def.  Rajeev Ram, 2–6, 6–3, 6–1

Doubles

 Marin Draganja /  Mate Pavić def.  Samuel Groth /  John-Patrick Smith, 5–7, 6–2, [13–11]

External links
Official Website 

Jalisco Open
Jalisco Open
2013 in Mexican tennis